Diana Stateczny (born 13 January 1980) is a German snooker and pool player. She won the women's 2019 EBSA European Snooker Championship.

Career

Early career
Stateczny started playing cue sports in 1995, initially pool, but focusing on snooker from around 2009.

She was runner-up at the 2005 14.1 European Pool Championships, and won the 2007 Eight-ball European Pool Championships

European Snooker Championship Finals
She was therefore the top seed in the knockout, where she beat Anne-Katrin Hirsch 4–3 and Natascha Niermann 4–0 to reach the final. She lost in the final 3–5 to defending champion Wendy Jans.

Stateczny won all of her matches in qualifying for the knockout of the 2019 EBSA European Snooker Championship. She then beat Ewelina Piślewska 3–2, Polina Astakhova 4–1 and Linda Erben 4–1 to reach the final against Anastasia Nechaeva. Stateczny won the first frame of the final, before losing the next two. However, she then won the next three frames to record a 4–2 victory and win the title.

European Team Championships
Stateczny was part of the winning EBSA European Women's Team Championships in 2011, and was a losing finalist in 2015 and 2019.

Personal life
She lives in Bochum, Germany, and works for Phenox, a medical technology company.

Titles and achievements
Snooker
2020 International Billiards and Snooker Federation World Women's 6 Reds Championship runner-up, lost 3–5 to Nutcharut Wongharuthai in the final.
2019 European Champion
2019 European Team Snooker Championship Ladies runner-up (with Linda Erben)
2017 German champion
2016 German champion
2015 Team European Championship runner-up
2014 German champion
2013 German champion
2012 German champion
2011 German championship runner-up
2011 Team European Champion
2010 German champion
2010 European Championship runner-up
2009 German champion

Pool 
2007 Eight-ball European Pool Champion
2005 14.1 runner-up European Pool Championships
2005 European Team  Championship Ladies
2001 European Team Championship Ladies

References

External links
Diana Stateczny's Official Website
European Snooker Championships 2019 Final: Anastasia Nechaeva vs Diana Stateczny
Diana Stateczny – World Women's Snooker

German pool players
German snooker players
Female pool players
Female snooker players
1980 births
Living people
Competitors at the 2005 World Games
Sportspeople from Bochum